Demene (formerly:Taržeka) is a settlement in Demene Parish in Augšdaugava Municipality in the Selonia region of Latvia.

References

External links 
Satellite map at Maplandia.com

Towns and villages in Latvia
Augšdaugava Municipality
Selonia